Unit Structures is a 1966 studio album by free jazz pianist Cecil Taylor, released by Blue Note Records.

Background
Unit Structures was Taylor's first album on Blue Note. He released Conquistador! on the label in the same year, with a similar lineup. Jesse Jarnow of Pitchfork described the album as "among the most intense of the early free jazz albums".

The album was accompanied with an essay written by Cecil Taylor, titled Sound Structure of Subculture Becoming Major Breath/Naked Fire Gesture.

Critical reception
AllMusic gave the album five stars, with reviewer Scott Yanow opining that "Taylor's high-energy atonalism fit in well with the free jazz of the period but he was actually leading the way rather than being part of a movement... In fact, it could be safely argued that no jazz music of the era approached the ferocity and intensity of Cecil Taylor's". The Penguin Guide to Jazz awarded it three and a half stars (of a possible four), writing "Unit Structures is both as mathematically complex as its title suggests and as rich in colour and sound as the ensemble proposes, with the orchestrally varied sounds of the two bassists — Grimes a strong, elemental driving force, Silva tonally fugitive and mysterious — while Stevens and McIntyre add other hues and Lyons improvises with and against them."

In 2008, Cokemachineglow included it on the "30 'Other' Albums of the 1960s" list. In 2013, Spin included it on the "Top 100 Alternative Albums of the 1960s" list. In 2017, Pitchfork placed it at number 197 on the "200 Best Albums of the 1960s" list.

Track listing

Personnel
Credits adapted from liner notes.

Performers
 Eddie Gale – trumpet
 Jimmy Lyons – alto saxophone
 Ken McIntyre – alto saxophone, oboe, bass clarinet
 Cecil Taylor – piano, bells
 Henry Grimes – double bass
 Alan Silva – double bass
 Andrew Cyrille – drums

Production and additional personnel
 Alfred Lion – producer
 Rudy Van Gelder – recording engineer
 Francis Wolff – photography
 Reid Miles – design
 Cecil Taylor – liner notes
 Michael Cuscuna – reissue producer (1987 CD reissue)
 Ron McMaster – digital transfer (1987 CD reissue)

References

External links
 

1966 albums
Blue Note Records albums
Cecil Taylor albums
Albums produced by Alfred Lion
Albums recorded at Van Gelder Studio